is a national university in Takamatsu, Kagawa, Japan. The university was established in 1949 as a national university after the consolidation and reorganization of the Kagawa Normal School, the Kagawa Normal School for Youth and the Takamatsu College of Economics (formerly the Takamatsu Higher School of Commerce).

Faculties 
Faculty of Agriculture 
Faculty of Economics 
Faculty of Education 
Faculty of Engineering 
Faculty of Law 
Faculty of Medicine

Graduate Schools 
Graduate School of Agriculture
Graduate School of Economics
Graduate School of Education
Graduate School of Engineering
Graduate School of Law
Graduate School of Management
Graduate School of Medicine
Kagawa-Ehime Universities' Graduate School of Law
United Graduate School of Agricultural Sciences

Cubesat Experiments

STARS spacecraft 
The Space Tethered Autonomous Robotic Satellite (STARS, aka STARS-1, aka KUKAI, COSPAR 2009-002G, SATCAT 33498) robotic spacecraft developed by the Kagawa Satellite Development Project in the Kagawa University consisted of mother and daughter satellites connected by a tether. The main mission was: separate the mother and daughter satellites deploying the tether between them in the process, document the deployment of the tether using an onboard camera and demonstrate that the daughter satellite can perform attitude control using the tether and a robotic arm. The satellite also had amateur radio capabilities.

STARS was launched 23 January 2009 as a secondary payload aboard H-IIA flight 15, which also launched GOSAT. It successfully separated from the rocket, but the tether failed to deploy "due to the launch lock trouble of the tether reel mechanism." As of June 2022, the satellite is still in orbit.

STARS-II
A follow-on Space Tethered Autonomous Robotic Satellite II, STARS-II, launched on 27 February 2014 as a secondary payload aboard an H-2A rocket. The experiment was only partially successful, and tether deployment could not be confirmed.

References

External links
 Official website 
 Official website 
 Description of STARS

1949 establishments in Japan
Japanese national universities
Universities and colleges in Kagawa Prefecture
Takamatsu, Kagawa